Gold: Recorded Live at the Troubadour is a live album by singer/songwriter Neil Diamond.

While no singles were released in support of the album, the opening track "Lordy" appeared as the B-side of "Cracklin' Rosie". This is the only recording available of this song.

Track listing

Personnel
Neil Diamond – vocals, guitar
Carol Hunter – guitar
Eddie Rubin – drums
Randy Sterling – bass guitar
Jessie Smith, Venetta Fields, Edna Hunter – backing vocals (uncredited)
Engineered by Armin Steiner
Art Direction by John C. LePrevost
Photography by Jim Metropole

References

External links
Neil Diamond's Official Website 
Record Label

Neil Diamond live albums
1970 live albums
Uni Records live albums
Albums produced by Tom Catalano
Albums recorded at the Troubadour